Chimera is an American comic book published by CrossGen Entertainment from March to July 2003. It is a mini-series that ran for four issues. Chimera is most notable for its artwork. Produced by Brandon Peterson, the artwork is a blend of traditional and computer-enhanced techniques.

Chimera tells the story of Sara Janning, a woman who carves away massive chunks of ice as part of a tritium mining operation on the frozen world of Serevan, which on the edge of Chimeran space. Sara has been hiding on the world to hide her genetic makeup from the Chimeran Imperium, an empire of over 200 planets. When a stranger arrives at Serevan, however, Sara is discovered.

Storyline details
Sara Janning is an adult woman living on the planet Serevan. She has been hiding from the Chimerian Imperium ever since the Yamivol incident.

The Yamivol Incident
Sara grew up on an agricultural outpost on Yamivol Prime, a world that remained unaffiliated with the Chimerian Imperium for many years. Yamivol Prime was targeted for habitation by Chimerian forces when Sara was young. Her home was destroyed, her family killed, and just as she arrives to discover this, her dog is vaporized before her eyes.

The trauma from this event causes Sara to release the power of her Sigil which wipes out all the Chimeran forces on Yamivol Prime. It is unknown whether Sara already had her Sigil at this point or whether it was activated during the Yamivol incident.

Serevan
Sara has been living on Serevan for years, hiding from the Imperium. There she works, cutting gigantic blocks out of the ice. Upon returning from a hard day's work, Sara is approached by a new arrival to the planet, Jason Bryce. After an intense conversation, the two part ways. It is possible that Jason Byrce was either one of the First or an aspect of Danik.

Sara returns home to where a scientist, Isaiah, has been working on a robot called a Carapoid. The robot was left behind by an ancient race called The Progenitors. Sara names it 'Rover' and treats it like a pet. It is also revealed that it was Isaiah who provided Sara with a masking device to hide her DNA from the Imperium.

The next day when clocking in for work, Jason Bryce again approaches Sara. When clocking in, Bryce’s DNA is picked up by the Chimeran Imperium. This detection results in the Imperium mobilizing a fleet headed directly to Serevan.

Unaware of the approaching fleet, Sara heads out onto the ice with Jason Bryce as a partner. While searching for tritium, Rover unexpectedly unleashes a laser from its optical lens. As the laser begins to burn a hole in the ice, the ground starts to shake. With the ground giving way, the trio falls into a dark hole. When they wake up, they find themselves in front of a buried ship, later revealed to be a ship of The Progenitors.

References

External links
DAVE School Takes Comic Trip article about the short film

2003 comics debuts